This article shows the rosters of all participating teams at the men's basketball tournament at the 2020 Summer Olympics in Tokyo.

Group A

Czech Republic

The roster was announced on 8 July 2021.

France

The roster was announced on 21 May 2021.

Iran

The roster was announced on 3 July 2021.

United States

The roster was updated on July 16, 2021.

Group B

Australia
The roster was announced on 2 July 2021.

Germany
The roster was announced on 5 July 2021.

Italy
The roster was announced on 6 July 2021.

Nigeria
A 15-player roster was announced on 6 July 2021. The final squad was released on 20 July 2021.

Group C

Argentina

A 15-player roster was announced on 4 June 2021. The final squad was revealed on 18 July 2021.

Japan

The roster was announced on 5 July 2021.

Slovenia

The roster was announced on 17 July 2021.

Spain

A 16-player roster was announced on 6 July 2021. The final squad was revealed on 19 July 2021.

References

External links
 – Tokyo 2020 Olympic Coverage

2020
rosters
Basketball Men's